Chițu is a Romanian surname. Individuals with this name include:
Aurelian Chițu (born 1991), footballer 
Andreea Chițu (born 1988), judoka 
Marian Chițu (born 1986), footballer 
Vasile Chițu (1896–1968), general in World War II

Chitu may refer to:
 Chitu, Ethiopia, administrative seat of Wonchi woreda
 Chitu, alternative spelling of Chi Tu, ancient Kingdom in the Malay Peninsula

Romanian-language surnames